Rowland Edmund Prothero, 1st Baron Ernle,  (6 September 1851 – 1 July 1937) was a British agricultural expert, administrator, journalist, author and Conservative politician. He played first-class cricket between 1875 and 1883.

Background and education
Prothero was the son of the Reverend Canon George Prothero, Rector of St. Mildred's Church, Whippingham, Isle of Wight, Hampshire, and his wife, Emma, only daughter of the Reverend William Money-Kyrle, of Homme House, Herefordshire. He was the brother of Sir George Prothero and Admiral Arthur Prothero. He was educated at Marlborough College and Balliol College, Oxford, where he gained a 1st class honours degree in Modern History in 1875. In 1878 he was called to the Bar, Inner Temple.

Academic and literary career
Prothero was a Fellow of All Souls' College, Oxford between 1875 and 1891, during which time he played first-class cricket with Hampshire, and was also Proctor between 1883 and 1884. He edited the Quarterly Review between 1893 and 1899. From 1898 to 1918, he was chief agent for the 11th Duke of Bedford.

Writings
Prothero published The Pioneers and Progress of English Farming in 1888. His other works include, English Farming Past and Present, The Psalms in Human Life, Life and Correspondence of Arthur Penrhyn Stanley, published in 1893, and Letters and Journals of Lord Byron (1898–1901). His autobiography was entitled From Whippingham to Westminster. In 1901 he was appointed a Member of the Royal Victorian Order (MVO).

Political career
Prothero unsuccessfully contested Biggleswade in 1910 but was elected as Conservative Member of Parliament for Oxford University at a by-election in 1914, holding the seat until 1919. He held office under David Lloyd George as President of the Board of Agriculture, with a seat in the cabinet, between December 1916 and 1919, in which role he introduced a guaranteed price for wheat. He was sworn of the Privy Council in 1916 and on 4 February 1919 he was raised to the peerage as Baron Ernle, of Chelsea in the County of London, a title chosen in reflection of his pride in his own matrilineal descent from the Ernle family, one of the historic landed families of Sussex and Wiltshire.

Cricket career
Prothero played six first-class cricket matches between 1872–1883. Twice for a Gentleman of England team against Oxford University and in four matches for Hampshire. Prothero played for Hampshire between 1875–1883 before retiring from first-class cricket. Prothero's high score of 110 came for the Gentleman of England against Oxford University on 4 June 1879.

Family
Lord Ernle was twice married. He married firstly Mary Beatrice, daughter of John Bailward, in 1891. They had one son and one daughter. After her death in May 1899 he married secondly Barbara Jane, daughter of C. O. Hamley, in 1902. They had no children. She died in November 1930. Lord Ernle survived her by seven years and died in July 1937, aged 85. The barony became extinct upon his death, his only son, Rowland John Prothero (1894–1918), having died from wounds received in action in Mesopotamia during the First World War.

Selected publications

Articles

Books

 
as editor:  vol.1, vol.2
as editor:  
 
as editor:

Pamphlets

References

A Genealogical and Heraldic Dictionary of the Landed Gentry of Great Britain, 1863 edition, p. 1231 (lineage of Prothero of Malpas Court, co. Monmouth)
Concise Dictionary of National Biography
From Whippingham to Westminster (autobiography of R. E. Prothero, later 1st and last Baron Ernle)
Who Was Who
Wiltshire Archæological and Natural History Society Magazine, 1919.

External links
 
 

1851 births
1937 deaths
Barons in the Peerage of the United Kingdom
Members of the Privy Council of the United Kingdom
Prothero, Rowland
Prothero, Rowland
Prothero, Rowland
Prothero, Rowland
UK MPs who were granted peerages
Prothero, Rowland
Prothero, Rowland
People educated at Marlborough College
Alumni of Balliol College, Oxford
Members of the Inner Temple
Members of the Royal Victorian Order
Ernle family
Presidents of the Marylebone Cricket Club
Prothero, Rowland
British sportsperson-politicians
Barons created by George V